Vila Maria is Portuguese for Marytown.

Vilamaria or Vila Maria, may refer to:

 Vila Maria, Vila Maria-Vila Guilherme, Sao Paulo, Sao Paulo, Brazil; an urban district
 Subprefecture of Vila Maria-Vila Guilherme, Sao Paulo, Sao Paulo, Brazil
 Vila Maria, Rio Grande do Sul, Brazil; a municipality

See also

 
 Vila (disambiguation)
 Maria (disambiguation)
 Villa Maria (disambiguation)
 Ville-Marie (disambiguation)
 Maryville (disambiguation)
 Marysville (disambiguation)